Maughan may refer to:

Places
Maughan, Alberta, Canada
Lake Maughan or Mount Parker (Cotabato), stratovolcano on Mindanao island in the Philippines

Other uses
Maughan (surname)
The Maughan Library, a 19th-century neo-Gothic library of King's College London located on Chancery Lane in the City of London

See also
Maghan
Maugham
Mawgan
Monaghan